Yang Ji-won (born April 5, 1988) is a South Korean singer. She is a former member of T-ara, Spica and UNI.T.

Early life and education 
Yang was born on April 5, 1988, in Seoul, South Korea. However, she grew up in Jeonju. She graduated Poongmoon Girls' High School and subsequently the Department of Theatre and Film at Dongguk University.

Career

2007–2011: Pre-debut, Five Girls, T-ara 
Yang was originally set to debut as part of the five-member group Five Girls under Good Entertainment alongside Yubin, Uee, Jun Hyo-seong, and G.NA. In 2007, they starred in a MTV reality show Diary of Five Girls. However, due to the company's financial issues, the group never debuted.

She then trained under Mnet Media and was part of the original T-ara lineup with Jiae, Eunjung, Hyomin, and Jiyeon, the latter three eventually debuting with the group. Yang left alongside Jiae in June 2009, with Mnet Media citing differences in music style. She continued work as an actress.

2012–2018: Spica, The Unit: Idol Rebooting Project, UNI.T 

On January 10, 2012, Spica released their first digital single "Doggedly". In February, Yang formally debuted as a member of Spica with the release of the EP Russian Roulette.

In September 2014, Yang debuted as part of Spica subunit Spica.S (Spica Special).

On August 11, 2015, she took part in the kids' musical program The Fairies in My Arms with MBLAQ's Mir and Gfriend's SinB.

On February 6, 2017, CJ E&M announced the group's disbandment. After the group disbanded, she earned a living by selling green juice.

In July 2017, KBS announced their new survival show that would create two nine-member groups, one male and one female, among idols who had already debuted. Starting October 28, Yang appeared in The Unit: Idol Rebooting Project. She maintained a top 9 rank throughout the show and ranked sixth in the final, thus making it into UNI.T. 

On April 28, 2018, it was announced that UNI.T would be making their debut on May 17. However, their debut was pushed back to May 18. Yang debuted as a member of UNI.T with the EP Line and the title track "No More". On October 12, the group had their last Music Bank performance after which they had their last fanmeeting; they subsequently disbanded.

2020–present: Solo debut 
On May 8, 2020, Yang made her solo debut under CL& Company with her first single "Towards the Sun".

Personal life 
On the July 31, 2018 episode of Video Star, Yang revealed that she had a non-celebrity boyfriend.

Discography

Soundtrack appearances

Filmography

Film

Television series

Television programs/shows

Web dramas

Music video appearances

References

External links 

1988 births
Living people